The SsangYong Istana is a 2, 9, 12 and 15 seater minivan and minibus based on the Mercedes-Benz MB100 'Bus' variant. It comes with most of the options of the MB100 as well. The name "Istana" is Malay and Indonesian for "palace", which is the name of the presidential residences in both Singapore and Indonesia.

Gallery

References

Istana
Cab over vehicles
Vans
Minibuses
1990s cars
2000s cars